Abhishek Yadav may refer to:

Abhishek Yadav (footballer) (born 1980), Indian retired professional footballer
Abhishek Yadav (Nepalese politician) (born 1985), Nepalese politician
Abhishek Yadav (cricketer) (born 1995), Indian cricketer
Abhishek Yadav (table tennis) (born 1996), Indian table tennis player